Amerigo Tot (born Imre Tóth; 27 September 1909 – 13 December 1984) was a Hungarian sculptor and occasional actor. Born in Fehérvárcsurgó, Austria-Hungary he moved to Rome towards the end of the 1920s, where he lived for the rest of his life. He studied in Budapest under Ferenc Helbing and György Leszkovszky from 1926 until 1928, and then at the Bauhaus in Germany. As the Nazis came to power he moved to Rome where he worked sculpting memorials on a grant from the Roman-Hungarian Academy, where he eventually became an advisor. He fought in the Italian resistance movement starting in 1943.

He first received international recognition for his work on the frieze in Roma Termini station in 1950. He began doing abstract works in the 1950s. He returned home to Hungary several times, including 1937, 1939 and in 1969 in what was a carefully-prepared trip by the Hungarian communist culture-buro. In Hungary he was celebrated as a "world famous" artist and had big exhibitions. He did traditional works, including a Madonna sculpture in his native Fehérvárcsurgó, as well as abstract sculptures and public monuments, including Microcosm in Macrocosm (a tribute to Béla Bartók), His Majesty and The Kilowatt in Kecskemét. The Amerigo Tot Museum in Budapest is named after him.

In the 1960s and 1970s he made small appearances in films. He is perhaps best-known to English-speaking audiences for his role as Bussetta, Michael Corleone's bodyguard and executioner of Johnny Ola in The Godfather Part II. According to George S. Larke-Walsh, Tot's character in the film had to be brutal so that Michael's authority was retained. He also appeared in The Most Beautiful Wife and Pulp (1972). The latter was directed by Mike Hodges for United Artists and featured Tot as Sotgio.

Tot died in Rome in 1984. He is interred in the Farkasréti Cemetery in Budapest.

Filmography

References

Sources 
 - new website by Peter Nemes
 amerigotot.hu - website by Peter Nemes
 - Official Amerigo Tot Museum, Pécs
 - Amerigo Tot memorial room, Budapest
 exhibition in Ludwig Museum Budapest
 
 Sinkovits P. (1982): Az érintések öröme. (The joy of touch.) Report with Amerigo Tot. Művészet, XXIII, No. 7. p. 10-14. (In Hungarian)
 Nagy Z. (1982): Szemelvények egy életműből. (Section of an ouvre.) Exhibition of Amerigo Tot in Budapest, in the Vigadó Galéria. Művészet, XXIII, No. 7. p. 14-19. (In Hungarian)

1909 births
1984 deaths
Hungarian sculptors
20th-century sculptors
Bauhaus alumni
Hungarian expatriates in Germany
Hungarian emigrants to Italy
People who emigrated to escape Nazism
Burials at Farkasréti Cemetery